The following outline is provided as an overview of and topical guide to fiction:

Fiction – narrative which is made up by the author. Literary work, it also includes theatrical, cinematic, documental, and musical work. In contrast to this is non-fiction, which deals exclusively in factual events (e.g.: biographies, histories). Semi-fiction is fiction implementing a great deal of non-fiction, e.g. a fictional description based on a true story.

What type of thing is fiction? 
 Product of imagination – Fiction forms pure imagination in the reader, partially because these novels are fabricated from creativity and is not pure truth; When the reader reads a passage from a novel he or she connects the words to images and visualizes the event or situation being read in their imagination, hence the word.
 Source of entertainment – This type of entertainment is usually pursued to escape reality and imagine their own; which is suppressing depression with an emotional interest.
 Genre – any category of literature or other forms of art or culture, e.g. music, and in general, any type of discourse, whether written or spoken, audial or visual, based on some set of stylistic criteria.
 Opposite of non-fiction – non-fiction is the form of any narrative, account, or other communicative work whose assertions and descriptions are understood to be fact.

Elements of fiction

Character
 Fictional character – person in a narrative work of arts (such as a novel, play, television series or film).
 Protagonist – main character around whom the events of the narrative's plot revolve and with whom the audience is intended to share the most empathy.
 Antagonist – character, group of characters, or an institution, who oppose the main character.

Plot
 Plot – events that make up a story, particularly: as they relate to one another in a pattern or in a sequence; as they relate to each other through cause and effect; how the reader views the story; or simply by coincidence. 
 Subplot – secondary strand of the plot that is a supporting side story for any story or the main plot. Subplots may connect to main plots, in either time and place or in thematic significance. Subplots often involve supporting characters, those besides the protagonist or antagonist.
 Story arc – extended or continuing storyline in episodic storytelling media such as television, comic books, comic strips, boardgames, video games, and films with each episode following a narrative arc. On a television program, for example, the story would unfold over many episodes.
 Narrative structure – structural framework that underlies the order and manner in which a narrative is presented to a reader, listener, or viewer. The narrative text structures are the plot and the setting. 
 Monomyth – the hero's journey; it is the common template of a broad category of tales that involve a hero going on an adventure, and in a decisive crisis wins a victory, and then comes home changed or transformed.

Setting
 Setting –
 Milieu –

Theme
 Theme –
 Motif –

Style
 Writing style –
 Fiction writing –
 Fiction-writing mode –
 Continuity –
 Allegory –
 Symbolism –
 Tone –

Types of fiction

Literary fiction 
 Literary fiction – type of fiction that focuses more on analyzing the human condition than on plot

Genre fiction
Genre fiction – plot-driven fiction

Genres based on age of reader 
 Children's literature –
 Young adult fiction –
 New adult fiction –

Genres based on subject matter 

Mystery fiction –
Detective fiction –
 Fantasy fiction – genre of fiction that uses magic and other supernatural phenomena as a primary element of plot, theme, or setting.
 Science fiction – genre of fiction dealing with the impact of imagined innovations in science or technology, often in a futuristic setting. Exploring the consequences of such innovations is the traditional purpose of science fiction, making it a "literature of ideas".
 Pornography –
 Erotica – works of art, including literature, photography, film, sculpture and painting, that deal substantively with erotically stimulating or sexually arousing descriptions.

Genres based on form

Genres based on the length of the work 
 Flash fiction - A work of fewer than 2,000 words. (1,000 by some definitions) (around 5 pages)
 Short story - A work of at least 2,000 words but under 7,500 words. (between about 10 and 40 pages)
 Novella - A work of at least 17,500 words but under 50,000 words. (90-170 pages). The boundary between a long short story and a novella is vague.
 Novel - A work of 50,000 words or more. (about 170+ pages)
 Epic - A long poem.

Other genres 
 Fan fiction
 Slash fiction
 Real person fiction

Fictional elements 

 Libraries in fiction
 Fictional animals –
 Fictional species –
 Fictional locations –
 Fictional universes –
 Fictional planets –
 Fictional countries –
 Fictional cities –
 :Category:Lists of fictional things
 All pages beginning with "List of fiction(al)..."
 All pages beginning with "Lists of fiction(al)..."

History of fiction 

 History of literature
 History of film
 History of theatre

By content 

 History of mystery fiction
 History of detective fiction
 History of fantasy fiction
 History of science fiction

By form

By length 
 History of flash fiction
 History of short stories
 History of novelettes
 History of novellas
 History of novels
 History of epic poetry

Uses of fiction
 Instruction
 Propaganda
 Advertising

Narrative technique 

Narrative technique – any of several specific methods the creator of a narrative uses to convey what they want — in other words, a strategy used in the making of a narrative to relay information to the audience and, particularly, to "develop" the narrative, usually in order to make it more complete, complicated, or interesting. See List of narrative techniques.

Authors of fiction

Fantasy fiction authors 

 Piers Anthony –
 Julian May –
 J.K. Rowling –
 J. R. R. Tolkien –
 Stephenie Meyer –
 C.S. Lewis –

Horror fiction authors 

 Stephen King –
 H. P. Lovecraft  –
 R. L. Stine –

Science fiction authors 

 Isaac Asimov –
 Arthur C. Clarke –
 Philip K. Dick  –
 Robert A. Heinlein –
 Frank Herbert –

Comic authors 

 Jean Giraud –
 Stan Lee –
 Will Eisner –
 Alan Moore –

See also 

 Literature

References

External links 

 

Fiction
Fiction